Hazlegrove House is a substantial 17th-century house and Grade II listed building located in the parish of Queen Camel near Sparkford, Somerset, England. It was largely rebuilt by Carew Mildmay in 1730. After being used as a hospital facility during World War II, the house became the home of the Hazlegrove Preparatory School in 1947.
The house is  set within  of parkland, with direct access to the A303 road.

Due to school sports pitches and other developments the parkland was threatened to be put on the Heritage at Risk Register. However, this has not yet occurred as of June 2019. 

The gardens and parkland are listed Grade II on the National Register of Historic Parks and Gardens.

References

Grade II listed buildings in South Somerset
Structures on the Heritage at Risk register in Somerset
Gardens in Somerset
Grade II listed parks and gardens in Somerset